Keratin-associated proteins (KRTAPs, KAPs) and keratins are the major components of hair and nails. The content of KRTAPs in hair varies considerably between species, ranging from less than 3% in human hair to 30–40% in echidna quill. Both keratin and KRTAPs are extensively cross-linked in hair through disulfide bonds via numerous cysteine residues in keratins. Given the economic importance of wool, the KRTAP family has been studied intensively in sheep.

Genetics 

The KRTAP family of genes is unique to mammals. The family has evolved rapidly with about 188 genes in the mouse genome, 175 in the sloth, 122 in humans, but only 35 in dolphins (where only 9 genes are functional). In humans, there are 101 intact KRTAP genes and 21 (non-functional) pseudogenes. There are two major groups of KRTAP genes: high/ultrahigh cysteine (HS-KRTAP) and high glycine-tyrosine (HGT-KRTAP), that are thought to have independently originated based on their distinct amino acid compositions.

The KRTAP locus on human chromosome 17 includes the following 40 genes (in this order on the chromosome; lower-case "p" indicates pseudogenes): KRTAP3-3, KRTAP3-2, KRTAP3p1, KRTAP3-1, KRTAP1-5, KRTAP1-4, KRTAP1-3, KRTAP1-1, KRTAP2-1, KRTAP2-2, KRTAP2-3, KRTAP2-4, KRTAP4p2, KRTAP4-7, KRTAP4-8, KRTAP4p1, KRTAP4-9, KRTAP4-11, KRTAP4-12, KRTAP4-6, KRTAP4-5, KRTAP4-4, KRTAP4-3, KRTAP4-2, KRTAP4-1, KRTAP4p3, KRTAP9-1, KRTAP9-9, KRTAP9-2, KRTAP9-3, KRTAP9-8, KRTAP9-4, KRTAP9-5, KRTAP9-6, KRTAP9-12 KRTAP9-7, KRTAP9-10, KRTAP29-1, KRTAP16-1, and KRTAP17-1. Note that the other KRTAP genes form similar clusters on chromosomes 21, chromosome 2, and chromosome 11.

It has been proposed to change the protein names from KRTAP to KAP, with the numbering scheme remaining the same. However, the gene names would remain the same (KRTAPx-x etc.).

See also 
 Human chromosome 17
 Keratin
 Keratin-associated protein 5-6

References

External links
KRTAP proteins in Uniprot
hair
 proteins
Genetics